The 1997–98 Macedonian First League was the 6th season of the Macedonian First Football League, the highest football league of Macedonia. The first matches of the season were played on 10 August 1997 and the last on 31 May 1998. Sileks defended their championship title, having won their third title in a row.

Promotion and relegation 

1 Bregalnica Shtip was removed from the league after the round 19, due to the absence in a match against Sloga Jugomagnat. Their matches from round 14 were annulled.

Participating teams

League table

Results

Top goalscorers

Source: Top15goalscorers.blogspot.com

See also
1997–98 Macedonian Football Cup
1997–98 Macedonian Second Football League

References

External links
Macedonia - List of final tables (RSSSF)
Football Federation of Macedonia

Macedonia
1
Macedonian First Football League seasons